is a Japanese actress, tarento, and singer.

Shiina is represented with Someday. She graduated from Horikoshi High School. Shiina's husband is former footballer Kiyoshi Saito.

Discography

Singles

Albums

Videography

Filmography

TV drama

TV variety

Advertisements

Internet series

Films

Photobooks

Stage

References

External links
 
 

Japanese entertainers
Japanese actresses
Japanese lyricists
1982 births
Living people
People from Katano
Horikoshi High School alumni
21st-century Japanese singers
21st-century Japanese women singers